Bay-Tayginsky District (Bay-Tayga kojuun) is an administrative and municipal district (raion, or kozhuun), one of the seventeen in the Tuva Republic, Russia. It is located in the west of the republic. Its administrative center is the rural locality (a selo) of Teeli. Population:  12,321 (2002 Census);  The population of Teeli accounts for 31.4% of the district's total population.

When the 2011 Tuvan Bandy Championships was played, Bay-Tayginsky District was the winner.

References

Notes

Sources

Districts of Tuva